Nathan Jacob Fine (22 October 1916 in Philadelphia – 18 November 1994 in Deerfield Beach, Florida) was an American mathematician who worked on basic hypergeometric series.  He is best known for his lecture notes on the subject which for four decades served as an inspiration to experts in the field until they were finally published as a book. He solved the Jeep problem in 1946.

Nathan Fine retired in 1978 as a professor at Pennsylvania State University.  Prior to that he had been on the faculties of the University of Pennsylvania and Cornell University.  For a brief period (1946–1947) he also worked at the Operations Evaluation Group, affiliated with the Massachusetts Institute of Technology. Beside the book he published about 40 papers in several fields of mathematics. He is known for the Rogers-Fine identity.

Nathan Fine received his Ph.D. in 1946 from University of Pennsylvania, where he was a student of Antoni Zygmund. Fine was at the Institute for Advanced Study for the three academic years 1953–1954, 1958–1959, and 1959–1960. Fine's doctoral students include J. J. Price.

He wrote the book Basic Hypergeometric Series and Applications .

Selected publications

References

External links
 "Nathan Fine 1916–1994" – biography article by George Andrews
 Fine's Equation – in MathWorld
 "On Fine's Partition Theorems, Dyson, Andrews and Missed Opportunities" – popular article by Igor Pak
 
 

1916 births
1994 deaths
20th-century American mathematicians
Mathematical analysts
University of Pennsylvania alumni
University of Pennsylvania faculty
Mathematicians at the University of Pennsylvania
Pennsylvania State University faculty